Kottayi may refer to

Kottayi-I, a village in Palakkad district, Kerala, India
Kottayi-II, a village in Palakkad district, Kerala, India
Kottayi (gram panchayat), a gram panchayat serving the above villages